Preet Ki Dori is a 1971 Bollywood drama film directed by Satish Kumar. It stars Parikshit Sahni and Tanuja in lead roles. The music was composed by Kalyanji-Anandji.

Cast
Parikshit Sahni as Govind
Tanuja as Radha
Bindu as Rita
Jeevan as Banke Bihari
Nazir Hussain as Madhav
Lalita Pawar as Govind's Mother

Music
All songs were written by Indeevar.

External links
 

1971 films
1970s Hindi-language films
1971 drama films
Films scored by Kalyanji Anandji